Killer Country is the 37th studio album by Jerry Lee Lewis, released on Elektra Records in 1980.

Recording
Killer Country was produced by Eddie Kilroy, who had been involved with resurrecting Lewis's career back in 1968 when "Another Place, Another Time" hit the country charts.  The single "Thirty-Nine and Holding" would rise to number 6, Lewis's first Top 10 country hit since "Middle Age Crazy" in 1977 and his last to date. However, it is Lewis's version of "Somewhere Over the Rainbow" that is often singled out for praise; although it only reached number 18 on the charts, Lewis altered the spirit of the song much like he had years earlier when he recorded a boogie-woogie version of "Me and Bobby McGee," his ravaged voice giving the usually optimistic Judy Garland classic a forlorn vulnerability. "It had a certain feeling to it," Lewis told biographer Rick Bragg in 2014, "like a religious undertone.  A something that you seldom ever can hear."  The album also features Jerry Lee's first ever recording of "Folsom Prison Blues."

The Caribou sessions
Sometime before the release of Killer Country, Lewis went to the Caribou Ranch recording studio in Colorado and cut more than thirty songs from a wide variety of genres, but Elektra rejected them.  Extensively bootlegged, many Lewis's aficionados praise the recordings as some of his best.  Lewis's relationship with Elektra soon soured when its Nashville division was taken over by Jimmy Bowen.  Lewis and Bowen did not get on, to say the least; in the liner notes to the 2006 box set A Half Century of Hits, Colin Escott recounts, "Instead of appreciating the chance to work with someone from his era, Bowen saw no chance of recouping the $300,000 Lewis was to be paid for his next four albums. In his autobiography Bowen says he offered Lewis $350,000 to leave the label, then tells an astonishing tale of sending some of his guys to mollify Lewis, only to have him pull a gun on them. 'Then he muttered something about killing me,' Bowen writes. If anything, the story became even more bizarre as Bowen sent a crew to tap Lewis's phone to gather evidence, only to find the FBI already tapping it for other reasons."

Track listing
"Folsom Prison Blues" (Johnny Cash)
"I'd Do It Again" (Jerry Foster, Bill Rice)
"Jukebox Junky" (Danny Morrison, David Kirby)
"Too Weak to Fight" (Chuck Howard)
"Late Night Lovin' Man" (Rick Klang)
"Change Places with Me" (David Wilkins, Maria A. Kilroy)
"Let Me On" (Layng Martine Jr.)
"Thirty-Nine and Holding" (Jerry Foster, Bill Rice)
"Mama, This One's for You" (Ray Griff)
"Over the Rainbow" (E.Y. Harburg, Harold Arlen)

Personnel
Jerry Lee Lewis - vocals, piano
David Kirby, Duke Faglier - electric guitar
Steve Chapman - acoustic guitar
Kenny Lovelace - fiddle, electric guitar
Bobby Thompson - banjo, acoustic guitar
Russ Hicks, Stu Basore - steel guitar
Bobby Dyson - bass guitar
Bunky Keels - electric piano, organ
Jimmy Isbell - drums, percussion
The Lea Jane Singers - backing vocals
John Gobe, Rex Peer, Terry Mead - horns
Shelly Kurland - strings
Billy Strange - string arrangements

Jerry Lee Lewis albums
1980 albums
Albums arranged by Billy Strange
Elektra Records albums